Robert Clergerie is a French men's and women's shoe designer and founder of the eponymous label, with 21 stores worldwide.

Clergerie started his career in 1970, working for Charles Jourdan, and in 1978 bought the Joseph Fenestrier shoe factory in the town of Romans-sur-Isère, before launching his label there, making shoes.

Roland Mouret took over as creative director at La Maison Robert Clergerie in 2011.

References

External links

Living people
Shoe designers
French fashion designers
Year of birth missing (living people)